The FIBA Asia Champions Cup 2010 was the 21st staging of the FIBA Asia Champions Cup, the basketball club tournament of FIBA Asia. The tournament was held in Doha, Qatar in the hall of Al-Rayyan Sports Club Gharafa between May 22, 2010 and May 30, involving 10 teams and distributed to two groups as follows:

Qualification

Preliminary round

Group A

All times are local (UTC+3).

Group B

All times are local (UTC+3).

Knockout round

Championship

Quarter-finals
All times are local (UTC+3).

Semi-finals
All times are local (UTC+3).

Finals
All times are local (UTC+3).

Final standings

References

Results on Goalzz.com

External links
 FIBA Asia
 Official Website
 Asia-Basket

2010
Champions Cup
B
B